Billie J. Swalla is a professor of biology at the University of Washington. She was the first female director of Friday Harbor Laboratories, where she worked from 2012 to 2019. Her lab investigates the evolution of chordates by comparative genetic and phylogenetic analysis of animal taxa.

Education 
Billie Swalla earned her Bachelor of Science in Zoology with a Botany minor from the University of Iowa (UI) in 1980. She went on to earn a Master of Science in the UI Zoology department with Michael Solursh, completing her work on chicken egg development in 1983. The summer after Swalla earned her M.S., she took an Embryology course at the Marine Biological Lab in Woods Hole, MA which changed her research focus forever She earned her Ph.D in Biology from the University of Iowa on chicken egg development in 1988, continuing the work from her M.S., but proceeded to become a Post-Doctoral Fellow with William R. Jeffery studying gene expression during ascidian egg development. In 1988, Swalla and Jeffery traveled to the Station Biologique in Roscoff, France, to study the evolution and development of tailed and tailless ascidians. Shortly after, Swalla won a Post-Doctoral Fellowship from the National Institutes of Health and continued her work on developmental biology at the Bodega Marine Laboratory at the University of California.

In 1994, Swalla began her first faculty position and worked as an Assistant Professor of Biology at Vanderbilt University for three years. She then worked as an Assistant Professor of Biology at Pennsylvania State University from 1997 to 1999 before settling at the University of Washington where her lab has remained.

Research 
Swalla's current research focuses on molecular analysis of invertebrate evolution and development, and ranges from studying hemichordates to chordates to ctenophores. By studying hemichordates, the closest living representatives of chordate ancestors, she examines the genomics of chordate development to better understand the evolution of the chordate body plan. Her work on other animal taxa, such as echinoderms and hemichordates, provide compelling comparisons in gene expression and body plan development to better hash out her research questions.

Swalla, with her various students and collaborators, have made substantial progress in understanding chordate evolution, including a supported theory on physical features the chordate ancestor likely had. Her work on phylogenetics of urochordates and hemichordates have revealed while gill slits are homologous between hemichordates and chordates, gill bars are not. She is continuing her phylogenetic studies looking at the evolutionary history of other ancestral chordates features across taxa. Within hemichordates, she is also looking into their phylogenetic diversity and how the evolution of a nervous system differs between species. Swalla has made substantial contributions to the genetics behind chordate development in ascidians and is continuing this work by examining the evolution of coloniality and social dynamics of ascidian species.

Leadership 
Swalla has served as Program Officer for the Division of Developmental and Cell Biology within the Society for Integrative and Comparative Biology (1996-1999), Chairman of the Electorate Nominating Committee for Biological Sciences (2001-2004), President of the Society for Integrative and Comparative Biology (2013-2015), and President of the PanAm Society of EvoDevo Biology (2017-2019). She was also the first female director of Friday Harbor Laboratories (FHL), from 2012–2019.

As director of FHL, Swalla established a new Marine Biology major for University of Washington students, and established fellowships and professorships to bring faculty to FHL and increase their research spectrum. For the well-being of all residents of FHL, she led fundraising efforts of over $10,000,000 and created a Fire Mitigation plan to protect the campus from wildfires. Additionally, Swalla has invested much of her career to outreach and inclusion. As director, she expanded a Research Experience for Undergraduates (REU) program through the National Science Foundation specifically for Friday Harbor Laboratories, to provide underrepresented students the chance to engage in scientific research over a summer. She had regular communication with the communities living around FHL on land conservation efforts and the marine habitats surrounding the residents, and shared their research through “Tide Bites,” a monthly publication available both online and in print for the communities around FHL.

Outreach and inclusion 
Alongside a continuing membership in the Society for Advancing Hispanics/Chicanos and Native Americans in Science (SACNAS), Swalla has worked across her career to increase representation in the sciences. She has mentored REU students in the program she began, and met with the REU students to discuss research, resumes, and graduate school. Swalla has taught sessions at local elementary schools, high schools, and community colleges ranging from her personal research to exploring career options. She has also taught in several international workshops to audiences from a variety of countries.

Select publications

References 

Living people
University of Iowa alumni
University of Washington faculty
Year of birth missing (living people)